Zebu  is a species or subspecies of domestic cattle.

Zebu may also refer to:

 EVE/ZeBu, company
 Zebu (ship), a tall ship